Solomon Sunday Osayande (“Sonny Ba”) Akpata (born 16 February 1937) is a Nigerian athlete. He competed in the men's long jump at the 1964 Summer Olympics.

References

External links
 

1937 births
Living people
Athletes (track and field) at the 1964 Summer Olympics
Nigerian male long jumpers
Olympic athletes of Nigeria